The following is a list of mayors of the city of Pointe-Noire, Republic of the Congo.

Under colonial administration 

 Jean Jacoulet (1939-1941)
 Capa Gary (1941-1945)
 Jouvenaux (1945)
 Charles Marmiesse (1945-1947)
 Henry Pouvergne (1947)
 Blanc (1947-1948)
 Dacosta (1948-1950)
 Pertihon (1950-1953)
 Henri Olive (1953-1955)
 Joffre (1955-1956)

Under congolese administration 

 Robert Stéphane Tchitchelle (1956-1963)
 Marcel Babindamana (1963-1965)
 Gustave Ondziel (1965-1969)
 Fayette-Tchitembo (1969-1970)
 Prosper Matoumpa-Mpolo (1970-1971)
 Docteur Jacques Bouiti (1971-1973)
 Jean-Pierre Mafouana (1973-1979)
 Zéphirin Mafouana-Makosso (1979)
 Fulgence Milandou (1979-1984)
 Jean-Baptiste Missamou (1984-1990)
 Jean-Pierre Detchissambou (1990-1991)
 Marcel Tchionvo (1991-1992)
 Étienne Boukaka (1992-1993)
 Jean Théodore Pouaboud (1993-1994)
 Jean-Pierre Thystère-Tchicaya (1994-1997)
 François Luc Macosso (1997-2002)
 Jean Christian Akonzo (2002-2003)
 Roland Bouiti-Viaudo (2003-2017)
 Jean-François Kando.since 28 August 2017

See also
 Pointe-Noire
 Timeline of Pointe-Noire

References

Pointe-Noire
Mayors of Pointe-Noire
Pointe-Noire
Lists of Republic of the Congo people
Pointe-Noire
People from Pointe-Noire
Republic of the Congo politics-related lists